Poesy an alternative anglicized term of the French word poésie meaning poetry. It may refer to:

 Clémence Poésy (born 1982), French actress and fashion model
 Poesy ring, gold finger rings with a short inscription on their surface

See also
 
 Poésie (disambiguation)
 Posey (disambiguation)